Oreopanax is a genus of shrubs and trees in the family Araliaceae, comprising circa 85 species native to the Americas.

Distribution

Oreopanax species' range extends from Mexico and the Antilles to Argentina and Brazil, with most species occurring above 500 meters above sea level.

Species

Oreopanax acerifolius
Oreopanax albanensis
Oreopanax allocophyllus
Oreopanax anchicayanus
Oreopanax andreanus
Oreopanax angularis
Oreopanax anomalus
Oreopanax apurimacensis
Oreopanax aquifolius
Oreopanax arcanus
Oreopanax argentatus
Oreopanax artocarpoides
Oreopanax atopanthus
Oreopanax avicenniifolius
Oreopanax bogotensis
Oreopanax boliviensis
Oreopanax brachystachyus
Oreopanax brunneus
Oreopanax bullosus
Oreopanax candamoanus
Oreopanax capitatus
Oreopanax catalpifolius
Oreopanax cecropifolius
Oreopanax cheirophyllus
Oreopanax cissoides
Oreopanax compactus
Oreopanax confusus
Oreopanax corazonensis
Oreopanax coriaceus
Oreopanax costaricensis
Oreopanax crassinervius
Oreopanax crataegodorus
Oreopanax cumanensis
Oreopanax cuspidatus
Oreopanax cyclophyllus
Oreopanax dactylifolius
Oreopanax deinocephalus
Oreopanax diguensis
Oreopanax discolor
Oreopanax divulsus
Oreopanax donnell-smithii
Oreopanax duquei
Oreopanax dussii
Oreopanax echinops
Oreopanax ecuadorensis
Oreopanax ellsworthii
Oreopanax epificus
Oreopanax epremesnilianus
Oreopanax eriocephalus
Oreopanax farallonensis
Oreopanax flaccidus
Oreopanax fontqueranus
Oreopanax fulvus
Oreopanax gargantae
Oreopanax geminatus
Oreopanax glabrifolius
Oreopanax gnaphalocephalus
Oreopanax grandifolius
Oreopanax grosseserratus
Oreopanax guatemalensis
Oreopanax hederaceus
Oreopanax hedraeostrobilus
Oreopanax herzogii
Oreopanax humboldtianus
Oreopanax hypargyreus
Oreopanax ilicifolius
Oreopanax impolitus
Oreopanax incisus
Oreopanax integrifolius
Oreopanax iodophyllus
Oreopanax ischnolobus
Oreopanax jatrophifolius
Oreopanax jelskii
Oreopanax killipii
Oreopanax klugii
Oreopanax kuntzei
Oreopanax lawrancei
Oreopanax lechleri
Oreopanax lehmannii
Oreopanax lempiranus
Oreopanax liebmannii
Oreopanax lindenii
Oreopanax macleanii
Oreopanax macrocephalus
Oreopanax mathewsii
Oreopanax membranaceus
Oreopanax microflorus
Oreopanax moritzii
Oreopanax mutisianus
Oreopanax nicaraguensis
Oreopanax niger
Oreopanax nubigenus
Oreopanax nymphaeifolius
Oreopanax obscurus
Oreopanax obtusilobus
Oreopanax oerstedianus
Oreopanax oroyanus
Oreopanax pachycephalus
Oreopanax palamophyllus
Oreopanax pallidus
Oreopanax pariahuancae
Oreopanax parviflorus
Oreopanax pavonii
Oreopanax peltatus
Oreopanax pentlandianus
Oreopanax pes-ursi
Oreopanax platanifolius
Oreopanax platyphyllus
Oreopanax polycephalus
Oreopanax pycnocarpus
Oreopanax raimondii
Oreopanax ramosissimus
Oreopanax reticulatus
Oreopanax ripicolus
Oreopanax robustus
Oreopanax rosei
Oreopanax ruizanus
Oreopanax ruizii
Oreopanax rusbyi
Oreopanax salvinii
Oreopanax sanderianus
Oreopanax sandianus
Oreopanax santanderianus
Oreopanax schultzei
Oreopanax sectifolius
Oreopanax seemannianus
Oreopanax sessiliflorus
Oreopanax simplicifolius
Oreopanax spathulatus
Oreopanax standleyi
Oreopanax steinbachianus
Oreopanax stenodactylus
Oreopanax stenophyllus
Oreopanax steyermarkii
Oreopanax striatus
Oreopanax sucrensis
Oreopanax superoerstedianus
Oreopanax thaumasiophyllus
Oreopanax tolimanus
Oreopanax trianae
Oreopanax trifidus
Oreopanax trollii
Oreopanax turbacensis
Oreopanax urubambanus
Oreopanax velutinus
Oreopanax venezuelensis
Oreopanax vestitus
Oreopanax weberbaueri
Oreopanax williamsii
Oreopanax xalapensis

References

 
Apiales genera
Taxa named by Joseph Decaisne
Taxa named by Jules Émile Planchon